FLS may refer to:

Places 
 Flinders Island Airport, in Tasmania, Australia
 Fordham Law School in New York City
 Free Library of Springfield Township in Wyndmoor, Pennsylvania, United States
 Frontline States, a defunct South African black majority rule organization

Organizations 
 Fellow of the Linnean Society
 Fiji Law Society, body that registers and regulates lawyers in Fiji
 Flowserve, an American multinational industrial supplier
 FLSmidth, a Danish multinational engineering company
 The Folklore Society, a national association in the United Kingdom for the study of folklore
 Forestry and Land Scotland, an agency of the Scottish Government

Science 
 Fibroblast-like synoviocyte, specialised cell type
 Flavonol synthase, a catalyst

Other uses 
 The Free Lance–Star, a newspaper in Fredericksburg, Virginia, United States
 The Sims 3: Fast Lane Stuff, a video game expansion pack
 Faraón Love Shady, Peruvian latin trap singer-songwriter and rapper

See also 
 FL (disambiguation)
 Feels Like Summer (disambiguation)